Sarah Beaudry (born 19 March 1994) is a Canadian biathlete. She has competed in the Biathlon World Cup, and represented Canada at the Biathlon World Championships 2016.

Career

Winter Olympics
In January 2018, Beaudry was named to Canada's 2018 Olympic team.

In January 2022, Beaudry was named to Canada's 2022 Olympic team.

References

External links

 Sarah Beaudry at the Canadian Olympic Committee

1994 births
Living people
Canadian female biathletes
Olympic biathletes of Canada
Biathletes at the 2018 Winter Olympics
Biathletes at the 2022 Winter Olympics
Biathletes at the 2012 Winter Youth Olympics
Sportspeople from Prince George, British Columbia
21st-century Canadian women